Rhyzodiastes fairmairei is a species of ground beetle in the subfamily Rhysodinae. It was described by Antoine Henri Grouvelle in 1895. It is found in Myanmar.

References

Rhyzodiastes
Beetles of Asia
Insects of Myanmar
Beetles described in 1895